Rebecca Bligh is a Canadian politician, who was elected to Vancouver City Council in the 2018 Vancouver municipal election.

First elected as a member of the Non-Partisan Association, she left the party in 2019 claiming its ideology was driving towards the "far-right" following the election of its new executive. Her concerns were echoed by 2018 NPA mayoral candidate Ken Sim, while Bligh's fellow NPA councillors Melissa De Genova, Lisa Dominato, Colleen Hardwick and Sarah Kirby-Yung did not leave the party, but took steps to distance themselves from its board. By 2022, all except De Genova had quit the NPA, with Bligh, Dominato and Kirby-Yung reaffiliating with ABC Vancouver, and Hardwick joining TEAM for a Livable Vancouver.

As a candidate of ABC Vancouver, Bligh was re-elected to a second term in the 2022 Vancouver municipal election.

Bligh identifies as queer.

References

External links

21st-century Canadian politicians
21st-century Canadian women politicians
Vancouver city councillors
Women municipal councillors in Canada
Women in British Columbia politics
LGBT municipal councillors in Canada
Queer women
Living people
Year of birth missing (living people)
21st-century Canadian LGBT people